

TOP-25 Ukrainian software companies for July 2018 (according to DOU rating) 

 EPAM (8300 specialists in Ukraine)
 SoftServe (7193)
 GlobalLogic (4610)
 Luxoft (3276)
 Ciklum (2404)
 NIX Solutions (2271)
 EVOPLAY (2050)
 Infopulse (1940)
 DataArt (1900)
 ZONE3000 (1640)
 ELEKS (1514)
 Intellias (1510)
 Genesis (1450)
 Netcracker Technology (1180)
 EVO (1179)
 Sigma Software (1083)
 Ubisoft (1057)
 Lohika (1036)
 N-iX (1030)
 Ring Ukraine (950)
 Playtika (920)
 Playrix (912)
 Ajax Systems (900)
 Astound Commerce (855)
 Innovecs (845)
 Ukrainestaff (845)

References 

Lists of companies of Ukraine